was a city located in Saitama Prefecture, Japan.

On May 1, 2001, Ōmiya was merged with the cities of Urawa and Yono to create the city of Saitama.

Since April 1, 2003, the area of former Ōmiya City has been divided into 4 wards: Kita-ku, Minuma-ku, Nishi-ku and Ōmiya-ku of Saitama City.

History

Origin and pre-modern history
Ōmiya is an indigenous Japanese language word which can be decomposed to Ō (大, kun'yomi (Japanese reading) おお: large, great) and miya (宮, kun'yomi み-や: noble or holy - house; palace or shrine) after the Hikawa Shrine.

The town was on the Nakasendō, a main national road in the feudal Edo period and the predecessor to a part of National Highway Route 17, and the Takasaki Line. Its name was derived from the famous shrine.

Modern Ōmiya
 On April 1, 1899, the town of Ōmiya as a modern municipality was founded.
 After the 1923 Great Kantō earthquake, bonsai nurseries relocated from Tokyo and formed the bonsai village.  
 In 1940, Ōmiya became a city after several surrounding village annexations/mergers.

Saitama City era
 On May 1, 2001, Ōmiya was merged with the cities of Urawa and Yono to create the new capital city of Saitama.
 On April 1, 2003, when Saitama became a designated city, the former area of Ōmiya City has been divided into 4 wards: Kita-ku, Minuma-ku, Nishi-ku and Ōmiya-ku.

Education

A North Korean school, Saitama Korean Elementary and Middle School (埼玉朝鮮初中級学校), was previously in the City of Ōmiya.

References

External links
 Archive of Ōmiya's website

Dissolved municipalities of Saitama Prefecture